VoiceHost is a UK (Norwich) based Internet Telephone Service (VoIP) which was founded in 2006.

The company develops standards-based VoIP telephony services using Session Initiation Protocol (SIP) and is a Quality Mark approved member of the Internet Telephony Services Providers’ Association (ITSPA).

Tesco controversy and notoriety 
The collapse of the Tesco Internet Phone service in 2010 (powered by FreshTel) Ofcom re-allocated the telephone number blocks to VoiceHost to enable services to continue for consumers.

Norwich Telecommunications Technology Cluster 
Based at Norfolk Tower the company is part of the technology cluster recognized nationally by Tech City UK as a telecommunications cluster.

The company is the only Local Internet Registry (LIR) within Norwich and a member of RIPE Network Coordination Centre and appeared on the Deloitte Technology Fast-Track 50 and 500 lists' 2015.

See also 
 List of VOIP companies
 Norfolk Tower

References 

VoIP companies of the United Kingdom
British companies established in 2006
2006 establishments in England